Dani Hamzo (born 18 June 1978) is a Swedish former professional footballer who played as a forward.

He has played in the Allsvenskan for both Östers IF and Assyriska Föreningen. He played for Öster in their opening game of the 2003 Allsvenskan season, a defeat against defending champions Djurgårdens IF.

References

1978 births
Living people
Swedish footballers
Syrian footballers
Swedish people of Syrian descent
Association football forwards
Östers IF players
Assyriska FF players
Allsvenskan players
Superettan players